The Bangladesh Gymnastics Federation is the national federation for gymnastics and is responsible for governing the sport in Bangladesh. Sheikh Bashir Ahmed Mamun is the president of the federation.

History
The Bangladesh Gymnastics Federation was established in 1972 and received government recognition the next year. In November 1973, national gymnastic competitions were held for the first time in Bangladesh. In 1974, competition for women gymnastic were started. In August 2019, Japan donated equipment, worth 1.2 million taka, to the federation.

References

Gymnastics in Bangladesh
National members of the Asian Gymnastics Union
1972 establishments in Bangladesh
Sports organizations established in 1972
Gymnastics
Organisations based in Dhaka